Commissioned by the Australian Ice Hockey League (AIHL) in 2009, the H Newman Reid Trophy is an Australian men's ice hockey trophy awarded to the team that finishes top of the standings at the end of each AIHL regular-season, otherwise known as the Premiers. The trophy Superseded the defunct V.I.P. Cup.

History
2009, H Newman Reid Trophy was commissioned by the AIHL board in 2009 to replace the Goodall Cup for the league champion following the removal of the traditional century-old Goodall Cup by IHA. It was designed to be a new 'tradition' trophy and was originally named the AIHL Champions trophy for this purpose.
 
2009, Adelaide Adrenaline won the inaugural AIHL Champions Trophy by beating the Newcastle North Stars 3-2 (OT) in the AIHL final.

2010, the Goodall Cup returned to the AIHL and was once again installed as the league championship trophy.  The AIHL Champions Trophy was subsequently renamed the H Newman Reid Trophy in honour of the Henry Newman Reid who opened the first ice rinks in Australia between 1904 and 1907 and whose family fostered the first ice sports including hockey in Australia. The trophy was reassigned to honour the regular season's top team in the standings (premiers) and replaced the defunct V.I.P. Cup, which had been last awarded in 2007. Adelaide's 2009 trophy win was backdated and changed to the Goodall Cup with the 2008 (Sydney Bears) and 2009 (Newcastle North Stars) premiers awarded the H Newman Reid trophy by the same measure.

2011, the Melbourne Ice became the first team to win the domestic double including the H Newman Reid Trophy by claiming the Reid Trophy for finishing top of the AIHL league standings and Goodall Cup by winning the championship final 3–2 over Newcastle North Stars.

From 2014 to 2019, the trophy was presented in name only, as the physical trophy had been missing, presumed destroyed. A new trophy was presented to the 2022 winners CBR Brave.

Year on year premiers

Premierships by club
Total number of premierships won by teams in the AIHL throughout the league's entire history.

H Newman Reid Trophies by club
Total number of premierships won by teams in the AIHL from the 2008 season onwards.

See also

Presidents' Trophy, the National Hockey League equivalent
V.I.P. Cup, the previous equivalent trophy given in the AIHL

References

Australian Ice Hockey League
Ice hockey trophies and awards
Australian sports trophies and awards
2009 establishments in Australia
Awards established in 2009